is located in Takarazuka, Hyogo, Japan. It has a capacity of 139,000 and it is used for horse racing. The land was originally owned by Kawanishi Aircraft Company, which manufactured combat planes during World War II. After the World War II, GHQ ordered the company to stop manufacturing combat planes, which ended in closing the factory. In 1949, Keihanshin Keiba K.K. built the Hanshin Racecourse. The racecourse was transferred to Japan Racing Association in 1955. A major reconstruction was completed in 1991, and another in 2006.

Physical attributes

Hanshin	Racecourse has two turf courses, a dirt course, and a jump course.

The turf's  measures 2089m (1 miles + 254 feet), and the  measures 1689m (1 mile + 261 feet). Two chutes allow races to be run at 1800m/1400m and 2600m/2200m, respectively. Races can be run on the "A Course" rail setting (on the hedge), or the "B Course" setting (rail out 4 meters).
The dirt course measures 1518 meters (7/8 mile + 360 feet), with a 1400m chute.

The 2089m-long outer oval turf course was part of a major construction in 2006, and was a 400m-long extension. This would eventually remove two old chutes previously used, including a 1600m chute used for the currently-used 1689m-long inner oval course. The reconstruction (until the course was completely reconstructed) forced stakes races held in Hanshin during the second reconstruction period to be held in other racecourses, including Chukyo Racecourse and Kyoto Racecourse.

Hanshin Racecourse hosted the Japan Cup Dirt from 2008; races prior to that was held in Tokyo Racecourse. It has since been moved to Chukyo since 2015 and is now known as the Champions Cup.

Notable races

References

Sports venues in Hyōgo Prefecture
Horse racing venues in Japan
Sports venues completed in 1949
1949 establishments in Japan
Takarazuka, Hyōgo